Attilio Brugnoli (7 October 1880 – 10 July 1937) was an Italian composer, pianist and musicologist.

Life and career
Born in Rome, Brugnoli graduated in piano and composition at the San Pietro a Maiella Conservatory. He soon began a concert career, both as a member of the Waldemar Mayer quartet and as a soloist.

In 1905 he took part to the Anton Rubinstein Competition, and won the composition prize, beating Béla Bartók. He was author of several publications about piano teaching and piano techniques. Married with pianist Elvira Silla, he suddendly died in Bolzano, where he had gone as to serve as commissioner for the final exams at the city conservatory.

References

Further reading

External links

 
 Attilio Brugnoli at Musicalics.com

1880 births
1937 deaths
People from Rome
20th-century Italian composers
Italian male composers
Italian pianists
Italian classical composers
Academic staff of Conservatorio Santa Cecilia
20th-century Italian musicologists